Special Squad is an Australian television series made by Crawford Productions for Network Ten in 1984.

Overview 
The series focused on an elite division of the Victoria Police, which handled crimes either too sensitive or specialist for regular squads. The Special Squad was headed by Det. Insp. Don Anderson (Alan Cassell), with his main operatives being Det. Snr. Sgt. Greg Smith (Anthony Hawkins), and Det. Sgt. Joel Davis (John Diedrich).

Special Squad was seen by many as an Australian answer to the British series The Professionals both for its focus on action and violence, and the fact that both series were produced by Raymond Menmuir. However, in reality the characters and plotlines were less developed than the British series.

The series lasted for 43 episodes in total.

Cast 
 Alan Cassell as Det. Insp. Don Anderson 
 Anthony Hawkins as Det. Snr. Sgt. Greg Smith
 John Diedrich as Det. Sgt. Joel Davis

Guest stars

Episode list

Home media 
In January 2023 Crawford Productions announced that the series would be released on DVD in March 2023.

External links 
Crawford Productions
Special Squad at the National Film and Sound Archive

1984 Australian television series debuts
1980s Australian crime television series
1980s Australian drama television series
Network 10 original programming
English-language television shows
Television series by Crawford Productions